Azania was a region in ancient Arcadia, which was according to Pausanias named after the mythical king Azan. According to Herodotus, the region contained the ancient town of Paus.

References

Geography of ancient Arcadia
Historical regions in Greece
Locations in Greek mythology